Mike Hermann is an American college athletics administrator currently serving as a senior associate athletic director for University of the Pacific. He previously served in a similar role at Norfolk State University and Old Dominion University. He previously served as athletic director for Niagara University from 1998 to 2006, at Towson University from 2006 to 2010, and at Kansas Wesleyan University from 2013 to 2019. In 2019, he was an Under Armour AD of the Year award recipient from the National Association of College Directors of Athletics (NACDA). 

Hermann also served as associate athletic director at Xavier University from 1993 to 1998, and at Seattle University from 2010 to 2013. Hermann graduated from John Carroll University with a bachelor's degree in 1982, and Kent State University with a master's degree in 1984. 

Hermann was named athletic director at Kansas Wesleyan University on July 17, 2013. Hermann resigned from Kansas Wesleyan to accept a new position as a senior associate athletic director at Old Dominion University on September 3, 2019.

References

External links
 Pacific profile
 Old Dominion profile

Year of birth missing (living people)
Living people
Kansas Wesleyan Coyotes athletic directors
Niagara Purple Eagles athletic directors
Towson Tigers athletic directors
Wright State University people
Xavier University people
John Carroll University alumni
Kent State University alumni